Biathlon at the 1988 Winter Olympics consisted of three biathlon events. They were held at the Canmore Nordic Centre, about 100 kilometres from the host city of Calgary.  The events began on 20 February and ended on 26 February 1988.

Medal summary

Four nations won medals in biathlon, East Germany leading the medal table  with two gold medals, and the Soviet Union winning the most medals with 4 (1 gold, 2 silver, 1 bronze). Frank-Peter Roetsch won both individual gold medals, while Valeriy Medvedtsev won three medals, two silvers in the individual events and gold in the relay.

Italy's two medals were the first in biathlon for the country.

Medal table

Events

Participating nations
Twenty-two nations sent biathletes to compete in the events. Below is a list of the competing nations; in parentheses are the number of national competitors. Guam and Puerto Rico sent biathletes to the Olympics for the first (and as of 2013, only) time.

References

External links
Official Olympic Report

 
1988 in biathlon
1988 Winter Olympics events
1988
Biathlon competitions in Canada